Suicide in the United States is a major national public health issue. The country has one of the highest suicide rates among wealthy nations. In 2020, there were 45,799 recorded suicides, up from 42,773 in 2014, according to the CDC's National Center for Health Statistics (NCHS). On average, adjusted for age, the annual U.S. suicide rate increased 30% between 2000 and 2020, from 10.4 to 13.5 suicides per 100,000 people. In 2018, 14.2 people per 100,000 died by suicide, the highest rate recorded in more than 30 years. Due to the stigma surrounding suicide, it is suspected that suicide is generally underreported. In April 2016, the CDC released data showing that the suicide rate in the United States had hit a 30-year high, and later in June 2018, released further data showing that the rate has continued to increase and has increased in every U.S. state except Nevada since 1999. From 2000 to 2020, more than 800,000 people died by suicide in the United States, with males representing 78.7% of all suicides that happened between 2000 and 2020.  Surging death rates from suicide, drug overdoses and alcoholism, what researchers refer to as "deaths of despair", are largely responsible for a consecutive three year decline of life expectancy in the U.S. This constitutes the first three-year drop in life expectancy in the U.S. since the years 1915–1918.

In 2015, suicide was the seventh leading cause of death for males and the 14th leading cause of death for females. Additionally, it was the second leading cause of death for young people aged 10 to 34. From 1999 to 2010, the suicide rate among Americans aged 35 to 64 increased nearly 30 percent. The largest increases were among women aged 60 to 64, with rates rising 60 percent, then men in their fifties, with rates rising nearly 50 percent. In 2008, it was observed that U.S. suicide rates, particularly among middle-aged white women, had increased, although the causes were unclear. As of 2018,  about 1.7 percent of all deaths were suicides.

The American Foundation for Suicide Prevention reported that in 2016 suicide was the tenth leading cause of death in the U.S., imposing a cost of $69 billion to the US annually. Other statistics reported are:
 The annual age-adjusted suicide rate is 13.42 per 100,000 individuals.
 Males die by suicide 3.5 times more often than females.
 On average, there are 132 suicides per day.
 White males accounted for 7 of 10 suicides in 2016.
 A firearm is used in almost 50% of all suicides.
 The rate of suicide is highest in middle age—among white men in particular.

The U.S. government seeks to prevent suicides through its National Strategy for Suicide Prevention, a collaborative effort of the Substance Abuse and Mental Health Services Administration, Centers for Disease Control and Prevention, National Institutes of Health, Health Resources and Services Administration, and the Indian Health Service. Their plan consists of eleven goals aimed at preventing suicides. Older adults are disproportionately likely to die by suicide. Some U.S. jurisdictions have laws against suicide or against assisting suicide. In recent years, there has been increased interest in rethinking these laws.

Suicide has been associated with tough economic conditions, including unemployment rate.

There are significant variations in the suicide rates of the different states, ranging from 28.89 per 100,000 people in Montana to 8.11 per 100,000 people in New York.

A firearm is used in approximately half of suicides, accounting for two-thirds of all firearm deaths. Firearms were used in 56.9% of suicides among males in 2016, making it the most commonly used method by them.

On July 16, 2022, the United States transitioned the National Suicide Hotline from the former 10-digit number into the 988 Suicide & Crisis Lifeline, linking both the National Suicide Hotline, the Veterans Crisis Line, and a network of more than 200 state and local call centers run through SAMHSA, the Substance Abuse and Mental Health Services Administration.

Trends in suicide attempts 
The spike in suicide rates in the United States during the 21st century has gained public and clinical attention. Studies have found that despite efforts to minimize suicide rates, rates have steadily increased by approximately 2% per year from 2006 to 2014. A national epidemiologic survey of 69,341 US adults found the percentage of adults attempting suicide increased from 0.62% in 2004 through 2005 to 0.79% in 2012 through 2013. Because of this, clinicians aim to determine whether this is a coincident national increase in suicide attempts. In order to achieve this, trends in suicide attempts are characterized among sociodemographic and clinical groups. It was found that suicide attempts impact "younger adults with less formal education and those with antisocial personality disorder, anxiety disorders, depressive disorders, and a history of violence” at disproportional rates. It is important for trends in suicide attempts to be investigated and researched for they help to determine the cause of the increase in suicide rates. Knowing the trends in suicide also allow preventative measures to be taken. Suicide prevention is possible through early identification and treatment of individuals deemed high risk.

Suicide as a public health issue 
Suicide prevention has been thought of as the responsibility of mental health professionals within clinical settings between 2000 and 2010. As of 2019, suicide prevention is being recognized as a public health responsibility rather than within clinical settings due to the trend in increasing suicide rates. In 1960–2010, population-based risk reduction approaches have been used for other diseases such as myocardial infarction. However, as of 2019, the urgency of development of effective suicide prevention has been recognized by the CDC. While suicide is often thought of as an individual problem, suicides may impact families, communities, and society in general. The responsibility of public health would be to develop policies to reduce people's risk of suicidal behavior through addressing factors at the individual to societal levels. "Public health emphasizes efforts to prevent violence (in this case, toward oneself) before it happens. This approach requires addressing factors that put people at risk for, or protect them from, engaging in suicidal behavior."

The CDC has created a National Suicide Prevention Lifeline where they provide free and confidential support for people in distress, prevention and crisis resources for people who are in need of such help, and best practices for professionals. In May 2019, Bloomberg reported that in spite of the recent mental health crisis, insurance companies, including UnitedHealth Group, are doing what they can to limit coverage and deny claims for mental health related issues.

A 2019 study by the National Bureau of Economic Research found a direct causal link between worker's wages and suicide rates, and that raising the minimum wage would result in a quick drop in the suicide rate.

In August 2020, during the COVID-19 pandemic, a survey conducted by the CDC found that 25.5 percent of people aged between 18 and 24 have seriously contemplated suicide within the last 30 days. For the age group 25 to 44, it was 16 percent. Glenn Greenwald of The Intercept said of the findings:

In a remotely healthy society, one that provides basic emotional needs to its population, suicide and serious suicidal ideation are rare events. It is anathema to the most basic human instinct: the will to live. A society in which such a vast swath of the population is seriously considering it as an option is one which is anything but healthy, one which is plainly failing to provide its citizens the basic necessities for a fulfilling life.

Subgroups

Age and sex

The National Violent Death Reporting System (NVDRS) keeps data on U.S. suicides.

Based on the NVDRS 2016 data, the New York Times acknowledged that, among men, those over 65—who make up a smaller proportion of the population—are at greatest risk of death by suicide. The NVDRS 2015 data showed that, among men of all races, men over 65 were the most likely to die of suicides (27.67 suicides per 100,000), closely followed by men 40–64 (27.10 suicides per 100,000). Men 20–39 (23.41 per 100,000) and 15–19 (13.81 per 100,000) were less likely to die of suicides.

White men are more likely to commit suicide. White men account for nearly 70% of suicides in the United States.

Race 
Native Americans and White Americans have the highest suicide rate in the United States.

By state
There are significant variations in the suicide rates of the different states. A number of theories for these differences have been suggested, ranging from socioeconomics (rural poverty) to access to firearms and social isolation (low population densities), and a study in 2011 found a correlation between altitude above sea level and suicide.

College students 

For college students, suicide is the second highest cause of death. The risk tends to be underestimated, as many falsely believe that young people do not have thoughts about suicide. The suicide rate for male students is about three times higher than that of female students. The study of suicide rates and trends was not common in the past, but it has gained more attention in 2019. From 1990 to 2004, about 1,404 college students died by suicide. This is about 6.5 percent of those who died by suicide nationwide. In 2014, the adjusted age rate was higher for male than female: the suicide rate for males was 20.7 per 100,000 while the rate for females was 5.8 per 100,000.

While counseling services can help prevent suicide, resource availability may be insufficient. Students who do not go to counseling services are at 18 times more at risk of suicide compared to those who do. If a college student has any suicidal thoughts, it is always critical to let others, such as members of the school, family, or friends know.

Occupation

A 2009 U.S. Army report indicates military veterans have double the suicide rate of non-veterans, and more active-duty soldiers have died from suicide than in combat in the Iraq War (2003–2011) and War in Afghanistan (2001–2021). Colonel Carl Castro, director of military operational medical research for the Army noted "there needs to be a cultural shift in the military to get people to focus more on mental health and fitness." In 2012, the US Army reported 185 suicides among active-duty troops, exceeding the number of combat deaths in that year (176). This figure has significantly increased since 2001, when the number of suicides was 52.

According to a June 2021 study published by Brown University's Cost of War Project, deaths from suicide among active U.S. military personnel and veterans of the post-9/11 conflicts outnumber combat deaths for those same conflicts by four times, with the numbers being 30,177 and 7,057 respectively.

Suicide rates among veterinarians are a growing problem: suicide rates among male veterinarians are twice the national average, and among female veterinarians the suicide rate is 3.5 times the national average.

LGBTQ

Attempted suicide rates for lesbian, gay, bisexual, transgender and questioning (LGBTQ) youth and adults in the U.S. are elevated in comparison to national rates.
According to the Centers for Disease Control and Prevention report, nearly half of LGBTQ students said they had seriously considered suicide.

Health or Disability

Patients with chronic pain are twice as likely to attempt suicide compared with those without chronic pain.

Studies have found very high rates of suicide in people with autism spectrum disorders, including high functioning autism and what was formerly known as Asperger syndrome. Autism and particularly Asperger syndrome are highly associated with clinical depression and as many as 30 percent or more of people with Asperger syndrome also suffer from depression.

Those with ADHD are 3-5 times more likely to die by suicide. A comorbidity of depression with ADHD is the best predictor of suicidal thoughts in adolescence.

Murder–suicide

There have been many high-profile incidents in the United States in the 1990s, 2000s and 2010s of individuals thought to be attempting "suicide by cop" or killing others before killing themselves. Examples include the 1999 Columbine High School massacre, the 2007 Virginia Tech massacre, the 2010 Austin plane crash, the 2012 Sandy Hook Elementary School shooting, the 2014 Isla Vista killings, and the 2017 Las Vegas shooting.

Comparison between countries

See also

 Assisted suicide in the United States
 Euthanasia in the United States
 National Suicide Prevention Week
 Suicide among LGBT youth
 Suicide among Native Americans in the United States
 Suicide in colleges in the United States
 Teenage suicide in the United States
 List of countries by suicide rate

References